Ameny Qemau was an Egyptian pharaoh of the 13th Dynasty during the Second Intermediate Period. According to Egyptologists Kim Ryholt and Darrell Baker, he was the 5th king of the dynasty, reigning for 2 years over most of Egypt, except perhaps the eastern Nile Delta, from 1793 BC until 1791 BC.

Family
The Egyptologist Kim Ryholt notes that Ameny Qemau's name is essentially a filiative nomen, that is, a name specifying the filiation of its holder. Indeed, Ameny Qemau could be read as "Ameny['s son] Qemau". Ryholt concludes that the Ameny in question was Qemau's predecessor Sekhemkare Amenemhat V and that Qemau was his son. This opinion is shared by Egyptologist Darrell Baker but not by Jürgen von Beckerath, who left Ameny Qemau's position within the 13th Dynasty undetermined in his handbook of Egyptian pharaohs. The successor of Ameny Qemau, Qemau Siharnedjheritef may have been his son as "Qemau Siharnedjheritef" may be read "The son of Qemau, Horus protects his father".

Attestations
Beyond his pyramid in Dahshur, Ameny Qemau is a poorly attested king: his name does not appear on the Turin canon and the only contemporary attestations of him are fragments of four inscribed canopic jars found in the pyramid. An additional plaquette of unknown provenance bears his name but may be a modern forgery.
Ameny Qemau's identity is therefore uncertain and attempts have been made to identify him with better attested kings of the period, in particular with Sehotepibre, who appears on the Turin canon after Amenemhat V. Ryholt however believes that Qemau's name was lost in a wsf lacuna of the Turin canon located just before Amenemhat V. A wsf (literally "missing") lacuna denotes a lacuna in the original document from which the canon was copied in Ramesside times.

Pyramid 

Ameny Qemau had a pyramid built for himself in the south of Dahshur. The pyramid was discovered in 1957 by Charles Musès and only investigated in 1968. It originally measured 50 square meters at its base and stood 35 meters high but is now completely ruined due to stone robbing. The substructures have also been extensively damaged. The burial chamber of the king was made of a single large block of quartzite, similar to those found in the pyramid of Amenemhat III at Hawara and the Mazghuna pyramids. The block was hewn to receive the sarcophagus and canopic jars of the king but only fragments of these and unidentified bones where found onsite.

Additionally, the name of Ameny Qemau is believed to appear on an inscribed block which was found in a newly discovered pyramid at Dahshur whose existence was announced in April 2017. Many Egyptologists such as James P. Allen, Aidan Dodson and Thomas Schneider agrees that the royal name on the block is that of Ameny Qemau. Dodson further speculated that, given the relatively poor quality of the inscription and the oddity for a pharaoh to be the owner of two pyramids, the newly discovered one may have originally belonged to one of Qemau's predecessors, and that he may have usurped the structure by chiseling out the royal names on the block and superimposing his own cartouches on it. Among the artifacts found in the burial chamber were a sarcophagus, canopic jars, and boxes of wrappings. Inscriptions on the boxes mention one of the daughters of Ameny Qemau, Hatshepsut, suggesting that the pyramid may have been usurped for his daughter and may explain why he has two pyramids.

See also

 List of pharaohs

References

18th-century BC Pharaohs
Pharaohs of the Thirteenth Dynasty of Egypt